The Go-Between is a novel by L. P. Hartley published in 1953. His best-known work, it has been adapted several times for stage and screen. The book gives a critical view of society at the end of the Victorian era through the eyes of a naïve schoolboy outsider.

Plot summary
In the book's prologue, Leo Colston chances upon a diary from 1900, the year of his thirteenth birthday, and gradually pieces together a memory that he has suppressed. Under its influence, and from the viewpoint of what he has become by the midpoint of "this hideous century", Leo relives the events of what had once seemed to him its hopeful beginning. The importance of his boarding school's social rules is another theme running through the book and complicates Leo's interaction with the adult world.

"Curses" of his devising had routed boys who were bullying Leo at school and had given him the reputation of a magician, something that he came to half-believe himself. As a result, he is invited as a guest to spend the summer at Brandham Hall, the country home of his school friend, Marcus Maudsley. There the socially clumsy Leo, with his regional accent, is a middle-class boy among the wealthy upper class. Though he does not fit in, his hosts do their best to make him feel welcome, treating him with kindness and indulgence, especially their daughter Marian.

When Marcus falls ill, Leo is left largely to his own devices and becomes a secret "postman" for Marian and nearby tenant farmer Ted Burgess, with whom she is having a clandestine relationship. Leo is happy to help Marian because he has a crush on her and likes Ted. Besides, Leo is initially ignorant of the significance or content of the messages that he is asked to carry between them, and the well-meaning, innocent boy is easily manipulated by the lovers. Although Marian and Ted are fully aware of the social taboo that must make their relationship a matter of the utmost secrecy, Leo is too naïve to understand why they can never marry. The situation is further complicated by the fact that Marian is about to become engaged to Hugh, Viscount Trimingham, the descendant of the area's nobility who formerly lived in Brandham Hall. 
 
As he begins to comprehend that the relationship between Marian and Ted is not to do with "business", as they have claimed, Leo naively believes that Marian's engagement ought to bring the correspondence between her and Ted to an end. Feeling increasingly uncomfortable about the general atmosphere of deception and risk, Leo tries to end his role as go-between but comes under great psychological pressure and is forced to continue. Ultimately, his unwilling involvement has disastrous consequences when Marian's mother makes him accompany her as she tracks the lovers down to their hiding place and discovers them having sex. The trauma that results leads directly to Ted's suicide and Leo's nervous collapse.

In the epilogue, the older Leo summarises how profoundly the experience has affected him. Forbidding himself to think about the scandal, he had shut down his emotions and imaginative nature, leaving room only for facts. As a result, he has never been able to establish intimate relationships. Now, looking back on the events through the eyes of a mature adult, he feels it is important to return to Brandham some 50 years later in order to tie up loose ends. There he meets Marian's grandson and finds Marian herself living in her former nanny's cottage. He also learns that Trimingham had married Marian and acknowledged Ted's son by her as his own. Trimingham had died in 1910; Marcus and his elder brother had fallen in World War I, Marian's son in World War II. In the end, the elderly Marian persuades Leo, the only other survivor from her past, to act once more as go-between and assure her estranged grandson that there was nothing to be ashamed of in her affair with Ted Burgess.

Reception
The Go-Between was first published in Britain by Hamish Hamilton in 1953. In the U.S., its publisher was Alfred A. Knopf in the summer of 1954, and the book was slow to sell at first. However, it was greeted with favourable reviews. The New York Times called it "a triumph of literary architecture", while two articles were devoted to it in the Los Angeles Times. Joseph Henry Jackson commented on its skilful presentation as “a many-leveled affair; perhaps only the author knows how much there is in it of symbol and reference." A month later Milton Merlin described it as "a superbly composed and an irresistibly haunting novel" characterised by "the author's beautiful and ingenious style, his whimsy, irony and humor, and, most of all, the powerful wallop of a deceptively simple, almost gentle story of a boy lost in a strange world of emotions."

There have been regular editions from Penguin Books and other sources since 1958. By 1954, translations were being prepared in Swedish, Danish, Norwegian, Finnish, Japanese, French and Italian. Others followed later in Spanish, Portuguese, Russian, Romanian and German. The novel has also been set as an exam text with a study guide dedicated to it and there have been interdisciplinary studies on psychological and philosophical themes there.

Interpretations
Later literary interpretations looked beyond the book's immediately noticeable themes. For Colm Tóibín in his introduction to a 2002 reprint, the book is not really "a drama about class or about England, or a lost world mourned by Hartley; instead it is a drama about Leo's deeply sensuous nature moving blindly, in a world of rich detail and beautiful sentences, toward a destruction that is impelled by his own intensity of feeling and, despite everything, his own innocence."  Kevin Gardner cites the narrative technique among other complex treatments of time: "Hartley's haunting tale of lost innocence underscores the modern experience of broken time, a paradox in which humanity is alienated from the past, yet not free from it, a past that continues to exist in and to control the subconscious … This doubling of consciousness and of narrative voice—the innocent twelve-year-old's emerging from beneath the self-protective sixty-five-year-old's—is one of Hartley's most effective techniques."

Another preoccupation in Tóibín's introduction was how far the story of "The Go-Between" is based on fact, in the wake of Adrian Wright's biographical study, Foreign Country: The Life of L. P. Hartley. Although Leo is twelve at the time of the novel – the long, hot summer of 1900 – the five-year-old Hartley remembered that time afterwards as "a Golden Age". When he was about Leo's age in 1909, Hartley spent a summer with a school friend called Moxley at Bradenham Hall in Norfolk and took part in a cricket match. The names are sufficiently close to Maudsley and Brandham to give rise to such speculation. But Tóibín counsels a cautious approach to the question, quoting Hartley's own study of fiction-writing, The Novelist's Responsibility. The novelist's world, he wrote, "must, in some degree, be an extension of his own life." And, while it is "unsafe to assume that a novelist's work is autobiographical in any direct sense," this does not prevent it from reflecting his experience.

Among other writers commenting on the book's contemporary context, Paul Binding has pointed out that its famous opening phrase, "The past is a foreign country", had first been used by Hartley's friend Lord David Cecil in his inaugural lecture as Goldsmith's Professor in 1949. Ian McEwan has described his acclaimed novel Atonement (2001) as "an act of homage in some ways" to The Go-Between in an interview, recalling that while reading the novel for the first time at 14 he was "electrified" by "the way you can wrap a fictional story around real events and real things and give it a vivid quality it would not otherwise have". Ali Smith revisited the observed parallel drawn between the treatment of class and sexuality in The Go-Between and in Lady Chatterley's Lover (1928). D.H. Lawrence’s novel was not allowed unexpurgated circulation in Britain until after The Go-Betweens appearance, but perhaps, she speculated, Hartley's novel helped prepare the climate for the overturning of the British ban on Lawrence's work seven years later.

Adaptations

Play
In 1960, an adaptation for stage by Louise F. Tanner was produced in Morgantown, West Virginia. Mrs. Tanner travelled to the United Kingdom to consult Hartley in person about the work.

Film

Playwright Harold Pinter adapted the novel into a screenplay of a film of the same name (1971), directed by Joseph Losey.

Television

A television adaptation starring Jim Broadbent was broadcast on BBC One on 20 September 2015.

Radio
On 8 July 2012, a radio adaptation by Frances Byrnes and directed by Matt Thompson was broadcast on BBC Radio 3. The production was re-broadcast on BBC Radio 3 on 26 May 2013.

Opera
In 1991, South African composer David Earl adapted the novel as a two-act opera.

Musical theatre
In 2011, a musical theatre adaptation of the novel was presented by the West Yorkshire Playhouse in Leeds, West Yorkshire;

Adapted by David Wood with music by Richard Taylor and lyrics by Wood and Taylor, the same production was remounted and opened at London's Apollo Theatre on 27 May 2016 and played its full twenty-week engagement, closing on 15 October 2016.

Bibliography
Colm O Tóibín, introduction to The Go-Between, The New York Review of Books, 2002
Adrian Wright, Foreign Country: The Life of L. P. Hartley, Tauris Parke 2001

See also

 1953 in literature
 Lists of books

References

External links

 

Fiction set in 1900
1953 British novels
British novels adapted into films
British novels adapted into plays
English-language novels
English novels
Hamish Hamilton books
Novels adapted into operas
British novels adapted into television shows
Novels by L. P. Hartley
Novels set in Norfolk
Novels set in the 1900s
Novels set in the 1950s
Fiction about suicide
Works about couples
Novels about families
Works about social class